Trentavis Friday (born June 5, 1995) is an American track and field athlete specializing in sprinting events. He is the USA Men's High School Record Holder over 100 metres.

A native of Gastonia, North Carolina, Friday attended Cherryville High School. He then attended Florida State University for one year, before turning professional by signing a four-year contract with Xtep in November 2015, in order to prepare for the 2016 Summer Olympics. However, at the 2016 U.S. Olympic Trials Friday only finished fifth in his preliminary.

Friday was named Gatorade National Track & Field Athlete in 2014.  He was also Track and Field News "High School Athlete of the Year."

References

External links

Florida State Seminoles bio

1995 births
Living people
People from Cherryville, North Carolina
Track and field athletes from North Carolina
American male sprinters
African-American male track and field athletes
Florida State Seminoles men's track and field athletes
People from Gastonia, North Carolina
21st-century African-American sportspeople